The following is a list of companies that received funding from investors on the reality television Shark Tank in the United States and its counterpart in Australia.

United States

Investors

In the United States Shark Tank series, there are main investors and guests. The primary investors have been Kevin O'Leary, Barbara Corcoran, Daymond John, Robert Herjavec, Kevin Harrington, Mark Cuban, and Lori Greiner. Guest investors have included  celebrities such as Jeff Foxworthy, Ashton Kutcher, and Chris Sacca.

Investments

Australia

Investors

The primary investors on the Australian version of Shark Tank have been Janine Allis, Steve Baxter, Andrew Banks, Naomi Simson, Glen Richards, and John McGrath.

Investments

References

External links 
 Shark Tank on ABC
 Shark Tank Australia on Network Ten

Shark Tank
Television lists